Far East Suite is a 1967 concept album by American jazz musician Duke Ellington, inspired by his group's tour of Asia. Ellington and longtime collaborator Billy Strayhorn wrote the compositions. 

Strayhorn died in May 1967, making Far East Suite one of the last albums recorded during his life to feature his compositions. The album won the Grammy Award in 1968 for Best Instrumental Jazz Performance – Large Group or Soloist with Large Group. 

The album was reissued in 1995 with four previously unreleased alternate takes. In 2003, Bluebird Records issued the album on CD with additional bonus takes.

Background 
The album's title is something of a misnomer. As critics Richard Cook and Brian Morton wrote "it really should have been The Near East Suite." Strictly speaking, only one track – "Ad Lib on Nippon", inspired by a 1964 tour of Japan – is concerned with a country in the "Far East". The rest of the music on the album was inspired by a world tour undertaken by Ellington and his orchestra in 1963, which included performances in Damascus, Amman, Ramall'ah, Kabul, New Delhi, Hyderabad, Bangalore (now Bengaluru), Madras (now Chennai), Bombay (now Mumbai), Calcutta (now Kolkata), Columbo, Kandy, Dacca (now Dhaka), Lahore, Karachi, Tehran, Isfahan, Abadan, Baghdad, and Beirut. The band arrived in Ankara but U.S. President John F. Kennedy was assassinated the day before its concert, and the State Department cancelled the tour. Scheduled performances in Istanbul, Nicosia, Cairo, Alexandria, Athens, Thessaloniki, and a week added to the tour for Yugoslavia were cancelled.

In early 1964, while on tour in England, Ellington and Strayhorn performed four pieces of music for the first time ("Mynah", "Depk", "Agra", and "Amad"), which they called "Expressions of the Far East". By the time of the recording sessions in December 1966 Ellington and Strayhorn had added four more pieces. One, the latter's "Isfahan" was formerly known as "Elf", and had in fact been written months prior to the 1963 tour.

Legacy 
Ellington very rarely performed the pieces that made up The Far East Suite. Cook and Morton have suggested that "Isfahan", which later became a jazz standard, "is arguably the most beautiful item in Ellington's and Strayhorn's entire output." The album had a big impact on the Asian American jazz movement. In 1999, Anthony Brown recorded the entire suite with his Asian-American Orchestra. Unlike the 1967 album, Brown's version used Eastern instruments along with standard jazz instruments.

Reception 

Cook and Morton, writing for The Penguin Guide to Jazz, give the album a four-star rating (of a possible four), noting that "Ellington's ability to communicate points of contact and conflict between cultures, assimilating the blues to Eastern modes in tracks like 'Blue Pepper (Far East of the Blues),' never sounds unduly self-conscious. This remains a postwar peak." Scott Yanow, writing for Allmusic, calls this one of Ellington's "more memorable recordings," describing it as an example of "Ellington and Strayhorn in their late prime," and as such, "quite essential."

Participating in Down Beat' s Blindfold Test shortly after the album's release, composer-arranger Clare Fischer was played track #7, "Agra." A longtime admirer and student of Ellington's work, Fischer had no trouble identifying the artist, awarding the track five stars, citing both "Duke's immensely creative writing" and his inexplicable ability to transcend "this same old tired instrumentation of trumpets, trombones and saxophones," while "perfect[ly] utilizing the men's specific sounds."  In addition, Fischer praised Ellington's ability to "take an exotic-sounding idea and create something – you might call it sophisticated crudity. It gives both qualities that I look for – an earthy quality and the sophisticated quality."

Track listing
(All compositions by Ellington & Strayhorn except 9.  by Ellington.)
"Tourist Point of View" – 5:09
"Bluebird of Delhi (Mynah)" – 3:18
"Isfahan" – 4:02
"Depk" – 2:38
"Mount Harissa" – 7:40
"Blue Pepper (Far East of the Blues)" – 3:00
"Agra" – 2:35
"Amad" – 4:26
"Ad Lib on Nippon" – 11:34
1995 reissue bonus tracks
"Tourist Point of View" (alternative take) – 4:58
"Bluebird of Delhi (Mynah)" (alternative take) – 3:08
"Isfahan" (alternative take) – 4:11
"Amad" (alternative take) – 4:15

Personnel
 Duke Ellington – piano
 Mercer Ellington – trumpet, flugelhorn
 Herbie Jones – trumpet, flugelhorn
 William "Cat" Anderson – trumpet
 Cootie Williams – trumpet
 Lawrence Brown – trombone
 Buster Cooper – trombone
 Chuck Connors – bass trombone
 Johnny Hodges – alto saxophone
 Russell Procope – alto saxophone, clarinet
 Jimmy Hamilton – tenor saxophone, clarinet
 Paul Gonsalves – tenor saxophone
 Harry Carney – baritone saxophone
 John Lamb – double bass
 Rufus Jones – drums

References 

1967 albums
Big band albums
Orchestral jazz albums
Swing albums
Duke Ellington albums
Bluebird Records albums
RCA Records albums
Grammy Award for Best Large Jazz Ensemble Album